Barr House may refer to:

Barr House (Amanda, Ohio)
Amelia Barr House
Charles Barr House
Cyrus Barr House
D. D. D. Barr House
Jacob H. Barr House
William Braxton Barr House